Anthony Delcollo (born 1985) is an American politician. He is a former Republican member of the Delaware Senate representing District 7.

Early life and education
Delcollo was born in Marshallton Heights in 1985 to Daniel and Barbara Delcollo. He attended high school at Salesianum School and is an Eagle Scout. Delcollo then attended La Salle University and then earned his Juris Doctor from Seton Hall University School of Law.

Political career
Delcollo was elected to the Delaware Senate in 2016 after defeating incumbent Democrat Patricia Blevins by 282 votes (50.55% to 49.45%). Delcollo joined State Representative Kim Williams to sponsor and help pass House Bill No. 337, which made Delaware the first state to fully ban child marriage for any person under 18 years old. While the bill unanimously passed the Delaware Senate, Republicans in the Delaware House of Representatives opposed the bill, stating that it was overly broad.

References

External links
Official page at the Delaware General Assembly
Anthony Delcollo at Ballotpedia

1985 births
Republican Party Delaware state senators
Living people
La Salle University alumni
Seton Hall University School of Law alumni
People from New Castle County, Delaware
21st-century American politicians
Salesianum School alumni